Frickenhausen am Main is a municipality in the district of Würzburg in Bavaria, Germany. It lies on the river Main. Frickenhausen is one of the oldest towns of Mainfranken with a beautiful town center.

Notable residents

Adam Grünewald (1902–1945), German SS officer and Nazi concentration camp commandant

References

Würzburg (district)